Gingles is a town in Ashland County in the U.S. state of Wisconsin. The population was 778 at the 2010 census. The unincorporated community of White River is located in the town.

History
On March 22, 1924, the town of Gingles was created. The town was named for Alexander Gingles, who came from Ireland to settle in Ashland County in the 1890s.

Geography
Gingles is located in northern Ashland County and is bordered by the city of Ashland to the north.

Demographics
As of the census of 2000, there were 640 people, 237 households, and 186 families residing in the town. The population density was 16.4 people per square mile (6.3/km2). There were 273 housing units at an average density of 7.0 per square mile (2.7/km2). The racial makeup of the town was 92.34% White, 6.25% Native American, and 1.41% from two or more races. Hispanic or Latino of any race were 0.47% of the population.

There were 237 households, out of which 37.1% had children under the age of 18 living with them, 68.8% were married couples living together, 5.9% had a female householder with no husband present, and 21.1% were non-families. 16.5% of all households were made up of individuals, and 3.8% had someone living alone who was 65 years of age or older. The average household size was 2.70 and the average family size was 3.06.

In the town, the population was spread out, with 30.3% under the age of 18, 4.2% from 18 to 24, 30.8% from 25 to 44, 26.6% from 45 to 64, and 8.1% who were 65 years of age or older. The median age was 36 years. For every 100 females, there were 103.8 males. For every 100 females age 18 and over, there were 103.7 males.

The median income for a household in the town was $42,188, and the median income for a family was $43,750. Males had a median income of $32,500 versus $21,111 for females. The per capita income for the town was $16,085. About 7.7% of families and 6.7% of the population were below the poverty line, including 3.2% of those under age 18 and 21.7% of those age 65 or over.

References

Towns in Ashland County, Wisconsin
Towns in Wisconsin